The Cole Block Building is an historic structure located at 702 5th Avenue in San Diego's Gaslamp Quarter, in the U.S. state of California. It was built in 1892, and housed the restaurant La Strada, as of 2011.

See also
 List of Gaslamp Quarter historic buildings
 List of San Diego Historic Landmarks

References

External links

 

1892 establishments in California
Buildings and structures completed in 1892
Buildings and structures in San Diego
Gaslamp Quarter, San Diego